San Francisco Chinese Hospital is a community hospital in San Francisco and the only Chinese hospital in the United States. The hospital is located in San Francisco's Chinatown.

Chinese Hospital primarily serves the elderly, poor and immigrants from China in the San Francisco area and provides an alternative to San Francisco General Hospital for patients with a language barrier. The hospital also operates CCHP, (Chinese Community Health Plan). The hospital's staff can provide services spoken in English, Mandarin, Cantonese, Taishanese and other languages.

History

Origins
Historian Him Mark Lai cites three factors that made it difficult for early Chinese immigrants to seek medical care:
 Many hospitals refused to treat Chinese patients
 Most hospitals were distant from Chinatown, and prospective patients were subject to attack en route
 Most Chinese immigrants did not have sufficient knowledge of English to communicate with American doctors

In 1888, the Chinese Hospital Association sought permission to erect a hospital in the University Mound neighborhood, but the Board of Supervisors referred the request to committee instead, based on opposition from existing property owners. Several so-called Chinese hospitals were established in San Francisco as privately run institutions of poor repute, mainly functioning as hospices and morgues, throughout the late 1800s.

Chinese Hospital traces its origins to 1899, when the Oriental Dispensary, with ties to the Tung Wah Group of Hospitals in Hong Kong, was founded over the protests of property owners on Sacramento Street. The Tung Wah Yi Kuk opened at 828 Sacramento Street, a site currently occupied by the Willie "Woo Woo" Wong/Chinese Playground. After the 1906 San Francisco earthquake and fire, it relocated to 14 Trenton Street.

1924 and 1979 buildings

From 1923, Chinese immigrants in the Bay Area contributed $145,000 towards the construction, and the goal of $200,000 was reached by early 1925. The modern Chinese hospital, in concrete and steel, with a touch of Oriental style in the roof lines, was completed at 835 Jackson St. in 1924 and opened on April 18, 1925, with a huge Chinatown celebration lasting several days.

By the early 1970s, the original building did not meet earthquake and fire standards established in 1947, and income (mainly derived from rental properties in Chinatown) was not adequate to provide sufficient funds to improve it. A new annex was built in 1979 at 845 Jackson Street, housing 54 beds. With the opening of the 1979 hospital annex, the original 1924 building was converted to a Medical Administration Building.

2012 expansion
In 2012, Chinese Hospital announced plans to build a replacement hospital building in the space where the 1924 building currently stood. The new building would take over patient care from the 1979 building, and the 1924 building would be demolished as it was seismically unsafe. The plans were approved and the 1924 building was demolished, despite significant opposition by the National Trust for Historic Preservation (NTHP). The NTHP commemorated the 1924 building as one of ten historic sites lost in 2013. There was a 41-space parking garage behind the 1924 building which was also demolished to make room for the new building.

As of September 2016, the new eight-story, $180 million building called the Patient Tower was set to officially open. The replacement hospital building was planned to have 54 beds and add a new 22-bed skilled nursing facility; the 1979 building would be converted to serve as a Medical Administration and Outpatient Center. Fundraising for the project was spearheaded by Rose Pak, a Chinese American activist who died September 18, 2016.

Operations
The hospital has been operating at approximately one-third of its 52-bed capacity since opening the Patient Tower, and Chinese Hospital sustained a $17.4 million operating loss in 2016. According to the hospital's CEO, Brenda Yee, "reduced support from the community physicians" has resulted in fewer admissions.

The non-profit Chinese Hospital, the Chinese Community Health Care Association (CCHCA, a group of physicians), and the Chinese Community Health Plan (CCHP, a for-profit insurer) have been allied since 1982 to provide an integrated health network in Chinatown. CCHCA negotiated contracts on behalf of its physicians, but in July 2015, CCHP began sending contracts directly to doctors, sparking a lawsuit by CCHCA against CCHP in August 2015. Yee, who heads both CCHP and Chinese Hospital, stated that CCHP was free to contract directly with doctors. CCHCA stated the hospital had cut them out of a mutually beneficial profit-sharing arrangement.

Leadership
Chinese Hospital is governed by a Board of Trustees, with members selected from sixteen community organizations serving Chinatown.

Notes

Hospital rating data
The HealthGrades website contains the clinical quality data for San Francisco Chinese Hospital, as of 2018. For this rating section clinical quality rating data, patient safety ratings and patient experience ratings are presented.

For inpatient conditions and procedures, there are three possible ratings: worse than expected, as expected, better than expected.  For this hospital the data for this category is:
Worse than expected - 0
As expected - 8
Better than expected - 1

For patient safety ratings the same three possible ratings are used. For this hospital they are"
Worse than expected - 0
As expected - 11
Better than expected - 0

Percentage of patients rating this hospital as a 9 or 10 - 68%

Percentage of patients who on average rank hospitals as a 9 or 10 - 69%

Services
Services provided by SFCH include:
 Surgical suites
 Intensive Care Unit
 24-hour Treatment Center
 Same Day Surgery Unit
 Western San Francisco Community Clinic
 Clinical and Pathology Laboratories
 Imaging Services (Radiology, Nuclear Medicine, CT Scanning, Ultrasound, Mammography, etc.)
 Cardiopulmonary Unit (Cardiology, Pulmonary Function, Respiratory Therapy, Neurology, etc.)
 Pharmacy

Famous patients
Actor and martial artist Bruce Lee was born at Chinese Hospital. San Francisco Board of Supervisors President Norman Yee was also born in Chinese Hospital.

See also

 History of the Chinese Americans in San Francisco
Other Chinese hospitals and health care serving local Chinese communities:
 Montreal Chinese Hospital
 Yee Hong Centre for Geriatric Care - Greater Toronto Area
 Tung Wah Group of Hospitals - Hong Kong
 Chinese General Hospital and Medical Center - Manila

References

External links
 SFCH website 
 
 
  A collection of photographs and news clippings detailing the history of Chinese Hospital.
  A collection of photographs showing the exterior of the 1924 building.

Hospitals in San Francisco
Hospital buildings completed in 1979
Hospitals established in 1925
Chinatown, San Francisco
1925 establishments in California
1979 establishments in California